Yuriy Nazarov may refer to:

 Yuriy Nazarov (actor) (born 1937), Russian film and television actor
 Yury Nazarov (born 1992), Russian ice hockey player